Cerrejonemys wayuunaiki is an extinct podocnemid turtle which existed in Colombia during the Paleogene period; the Middle to Late Paleocene epoch.

Etymology 
Fossils of the genus have been found in the Cerrejón Formation of La Guajira, from which it takes its genus name; "turtle from Cerrejón". The species epithet refers to the Wayuu language, called "Wayuunaiki" in its own language, of the Wayuu people, inhabiting the La Guajira desert.

References 

Podocnemididae
Prehistoric turtle genera
Paleocene turtles
Paleocene reptiles of South America
Peligran
Itaboraian
Paleogene Colombia
Fossils of Colombia
 
Fossil taxa described in 2010
Wayuu language